Bruno Weber may refer to:

 Bruno Weber (1931–2011), Swiss artist and architect
 Bruno Weber (doctor) (1915–1956), Nazi German doctor